Steve Bingham may refer to:

 Steve Bingham (bassist), English bass guitarist
 Stephen Bingham (born 1942), attorney
 Steve Bingham (violinist), English violinist and conductor